IV liga Lesser Poland group (grupa małopolska) is one of the groups of IV liga, the 5th level of Polish football league system.
The league was created in season 2000/2001 after introducing new administrative division of Poland. Until the end of the 2007/08 season IV liga lay at 4th tier of league system but this was changed with the formation of the Ekstraklasa as the top level league in Poland.
The clubs from Lesser Poland Voivodeship compete in this group. The winner of the league is promoted to III liga group IV. The bottom teams are relegated to the groups of Liga okręgowa from Lesser Poland Voivodeship. These groups are Kraków I, Kraków II, Kraków III, Nowy Sącz, Tarnów I, Tarnów II and Wadowice.

Season 2020/21 

The 2020/21 season kicked of 8th August 2020 in two groups: Wschód (east) and Zachód (west). One team will be promoted to III liga, the winner of the play-offs between the champions of the eastern and western group. After the end of the 2020/2021 season, the number of teams relegated from a given group of the league will dependent on the number of promoted teams from territoriality appropriate groups of Liga Okręgowa (4 to each group of the IV Liga) and the relegated teams from the III liga, so each group in IV Liga in the season 2021/2022 consisted of 18 teams.

For the 2020/21 season, the official sponsor of the IV Liga and lower leagues is KEEZA. It is a brand of sportswear and clubs will receive vouchers for these products, most of them symbolic. Fourth league clubs are supported with a voucher of 1500 PLN, teams from Liga Okręgowa 1000 PLN, teams from Klasa A - 500 PLN, and teams from Klasa B and C - 300 PLN.  Additionally, all clubs are entitled to a 50% discount on KEEZA products, calculated on the list prices. As part of the agreement, the leagues official title will bear the brand name as following:
 „KEEZA” IV liga
 „KEEZA” Klasa Okręgowa
 „KEEZA” Klasa A
 „KEEZA” Klasa B
 „KEEZA” Klasa C

"Keeza" IV liga (group: Lesser Poland - East)

League table

"Keeza" IV liga (group: Lesser Poland - West)

League table

Promotion play-offs

Season 2019/20 
Due to the COVID-19 pandemic, the season did not restart after the winter break. The Promotion play-offs did go ahead between the first placed teams from the East and West groups, Unia Tarnów and Cracovia II.Eventually Cracovia II was promoted to III liga with 5-1 aggregate score over Unia Tarnów.

IV liga (group: Lesser Poland - East)

League table

IV liga (group: Lesser Poland - West)

League table

Promotion play-offs
A two match play-off was held between the first placed teams of the "East" and "West" group, Unia Tarnów and Cracovia II. The winner of the play-offs would win promotion to III liga.

</onlyinclude>

Season 2018/19

League table

Season 2017/18

League table

Season 2016/17

League table

Season 2015/16

League table

Season 2014/15

League table

Season 2013/14

League table

Season 2012/13

League table

Season 2011/12

League table

Season 2010/11

League table

Season 2009/10

League table

Season 2008/09 
IV liga became the 5th level of Polish football league system due to the formation of Ekstraklasa as the top level league in Poland.

League table

Season 2007/08

League table

Season 2006/07

League table

Season 2005/06

League table

Season 2004/05

League table

Season 2003/04

League table

Season 2002/03

League table

Season 2001/02

League table

Season 2000/01

League table

All-time table 
The table that follows is accurate as of the end of the 2017/18 season. It includes the clubs that played at least one match (even annulled) in IV liga Lesser Poland group.

References

Football leagues in Poland
Lesser Poland Voivodeship